Fico or FICO may refer to:

 Fico (surname), a surname
 Hurricane Fico, a hurricane in the 1978 Pacific hurricane season
 FICO or Fair Isaac, an American company 
 FICO score, a credit score
 Financing Corporation, an entity created to finance debts from the United States savings and loan crisis